Yuri Anatolyevich Krasnozhan (born 7 June 1963) is a Russian professional football coach and a former player. He is the manager of Russia women's national football team.

Career
Born in Nalchik, Krasnozhan became the head coach of his native club Spartak Nalchik in 2004. In 2005, he managed to promote the modest club to the Russian Premier League. In spite of insufficient financing, the team avoided relegation, and nearly reached the Europa League places finishing in the 6th position in 2010. Following that season, Krasnozhan resigned to move to Lokomotiv Moscow.

On 4 June 2011, rumours spread that Lokomotiv chairman Olga Smorodskaya suspected Krasnozhan of throwing the home league game against FC Anzhi Makhachkala, played on 27 May and finished 1-2, and decided to fire him on the grounds of the suspicion. Lokomotiv was 5th in the table at that moment, just one point away from first-placed CSKA. On 6 July, after Lokomotiv Committee of Directors meeting, Krasnozhan's contract was officially terminated on the basis of "negligence in his job". Russian Football Union subsequently refused to investigate the case. On 27 December 2011, he was presented as Anzhi Makhachakala's head coach, on a 5-year deal. On 13 February 2012, before the team played a single official competitive game under his management, Krasnozhan was fired from Anzhi Makhachakala due to an unstable relationship with some players.

On 16 August 2012, he joined FC Kuban Krasnodar. On 8 January 2013, Krasnozhan was dismissed from his position after decision of the main investor.

On 26 May 2013, he was hired by FC Terek Grozny. He resigned on 28 October 2013 after Terek won only one game out of first 14 and was in 14th position in the table.

On 7 February 2014, Krasnozhan was announced as a new head coach of Kazakhstan national football team. He left in 2015.

On 9 February 2018, he signed with the Russian Football National League club FC Khimki. He left Khimki at the end of the season.

On 30 December 2020, he was hired as head coach of the Russia women's national football team.

Managerial statistics

References

1963 births
Living people
Sportspeople from Nalchik
Soviet footballers
Russian footballers
Association football defenders
PFC Spartak Nalchik players
Russian football managers
Russian Premier League managers
PFC Spartak Nalchik managers
FC Lokomotiv Moscow managers
FC Anzhi Makhachkala managers
FC Kuban Krasnodar managers
FC Akhmat Grozny managers
Kazakhstan national football team managers
FC Khimki managers
Russia women's national football team managers
Russian expatriate football managers